Agnes Fabish (21 December 1873–21 July 1947) was a New Zealand domestic servant, farmer and homemaker.

References

1873 births
1947 deaths
New Zealand farmers
New Zealand women farmers
Servants
New Zealand domestic workers